Amgoria, previously known as Amgadda, is a large village Burdwan division of the West Bengal state in India. Situated in the pocket of Burdwan, Birbhum, Murshidabad and Nadia District. 29 km by road from Katwa, 32 km from Shantiniketan. The village was formerly under the Birbhum District; in 1946-47, it was incorporated in Burdwan District. Amgoria is connected to the rest of India through Metal Road Net.

Villages in Purba Bardhaman district